The Service Medal in Silver was instituted by the President of the Republic of South Africa in April 1996. It was awarded to veteran cadres of Umkhonto we Sizwe, the military wing of the African National Congress, for twenty years service.

Umkhonto we Sizwe
Umkhonto we Sizwe, abbreviated as MK, "Spear of the Nation" in Zulu, was the para-military wing of the African National Congress (ANC). It was established on 16 December 1961 to wage an armed "struggle" against the Nationalist government inside South Africa. On 27 April 1994, Umkhonto we Sizwe was amalgamated with six other military forces into the South African National Defence Force (SANDF).

Institution
The Service Medal in Silver was instituted by the President of South Africa in April 1996. It is the middle award of a set of three medals for long service, along with the Service Medal in Gold and the Service Medal in Bronze.

Umkhonto we Sizwe's military decorations and medals were modelled on those of the South African Defence Force and these three medals are the approximate equivalents of, respectively, the Good Service Medal, Gold, the Good Service Medal, Silver and the Good Service Medal, Bronze.

Award criteria
The medal could be awarded to veteran cadres of Umkhonto we Sizwe for twenty years service.

Order of wear

The position of the Service Medal in Silver in the official military and national orders of precedence was revised upon the institution of a new set of honours on 27 April 2003, but it remained unchanged.

Umkhonto we Sizwe
  
Official MK order of precedence:
 Preceded by the Service Medal in Gold.
 Succeeded by the Service Medal in Bronze.

South African National Defence Force until 26 April 2003
  
Official SANDF order of precedence:
 Preceded by the Long Service Medal, Silver of the Republic of Venda.
 Succeeded by the Silver Service Medal of the Azanian People's Liberation Army.
Official national order of precedence:
 Preceded by the Police Medal for Merit of the QwaQwa Homeland.
 Succeeded by the Silver Service Medal of the Azanian People's Liberation Army.

Description
Obverse
The Service Medal in Silver is an oval medallion with a raised edge, struck in silver and depicting the Umkhonto we Sizwe emblem.

Reverse
The reverse is smooth and displays the embellished pre-1994 South African Coat of Arms with watermarks impressed below and the medal number impressed above.

Ribbon
The ribbon is 32 millimetres wide and green, with an 8 millimetres wide black edge at left and an 8 millimetres wide yellow edge at right.

Discontinuation
Conferment of the Service Medal in Silver was discontinued upon the institution of a new set of honours on 27 April 2003.

References

Military decorations and medals of uMkhonto we Sizwe
1996 establishments in South Africa
Awards established in 1996